The 1996–97 NHL season was the 80th regular season of the National Hockey League. The Stanley Cup winners were the Detroit Red Wings, who swept the Philadelphia Flyers in four games and won the Stanley Cup for the first time in 42 years.

The regular season saw a decline in scoring and rise in the number of shutouts to an all-time record of 127. This trend continued into the playoffs, during which an all-time record of 18 shutouts were recorded. Only two players, Mario Lemieux and Teemu Selanne, reached the 100-point plateau during the regular season (compared with 12 who reached the plateau in 1995–96). Many factors, including fewer power plays, more calls of the skate-in-the-crease rule, fewer shots on goal and more injuries to star players than the season before, contributed to the reduction in scoring and skyrocketing in shutouts.

This was the first time in 30 years—and in the entire expansion era—that the Boston Bruins had a losing record and missed the playoffs, ending a still-unsurpassed North American professional sports streak of 29-straight seasons in the playoffs.

League business
This was the first season for the Phoenix Coyotes, who had relocated from Winnipeg and had previously been known as the Winnipeg Jets. They would remain in the Central Division.

On March 26, 1997, the Hartford Whalers announced that they would move from Connecticut following the 1996–97 season. On May 5, they announced that starting in the 1997–98 NHL season, they would be known as the Carolina Hurricanes.

The 1996–97 season marked the retirement of Craig MacTavish, the last active NHL player who played without a protective helmet. MacTavish had been grandfathered under the old rule requiring them to be worn because he had signed a pro contract before the rule was established on June 1, 1979. The first player to ever wear a helmet was George Owen in the 1928–29 season.

Regular season
The Boston Bruins recorded the League's worst record, missing the playoffs for the first time in 30 seasons and ending the longest consecutive playoff streak ever recorded in the history of North American professional sports.

On November 16, 1996, the eight-sided scoreboard at the Marine Midland Arena in Buffalo crashed to the ice during a maintenance check. The accident occurred only 90 minutes after the visiting Boston Bruins players had conducted their morning practice. No-one was injured, but the game between the Buffalo Sabres and the Bruins was postponed.

Final standings
Eastern Conference

Western Conference

Note: W = Wins, L = Losses, T = Ties, GF= Goals For, GA = Goals Against, Pts = Points

Playoffs

Bracket

Awards
The NHL Awards presentation took place on June 19, 1997.

All-Star teams

Player statistics

Scoring leaders

Note: GP = Games Played, G = Goals, A = Assists, Pts = Points

Leading goaltenders
Regular season

Coaches

Eastern Conference
Boston Bruins: Steve Kasper
Buffalo Sabres: Ted Nolan
Florida Panthers: Doug MacLean
Hartford Whalers: Paul Maurice
Montreal Canadiens: Mario Tremblay
New Jersey Devils: Jacques Lemaire
New York Islanders: Mike Milbury
New York Rangers: Colin Campbell
Ottawa Senators: Jacques Martin
Philadelphia Flyers: Terry Murray
Pittsburgh Penguins: Eddie Johnston and Craig Patrick
Tampa Bay Lightning: Terry Crisp
Washington Capitals: Jim Schoenfeld

Western Conference
Mighty Ducks of Anaheim: Ron Wilson
Calgary Flames: Pierre Page
Chicago Blackhawks: Craig Hartsburg
Colorado Avalanche: Marc Crawford
Dallas Stars: Ken Hitchcock
Detroit Red Wings: Scotty Bowman
Edmonton Oilers: Ron Low
Los Angeles Kings: Larry Robinson
Phoenix Coyotes: Don Hay
San Jose Sharks: Al Sims and Darryl Sutter
St. Louis Blues: Mike Keenan, Jim Roberts (interim) and Joel Quenneville
Toronto Maple Leafs: Mike Murphy
Vancouver Canucks: Tom Renney

Milestones

Debuts

The following is a list of players of note who played their first NHL game in 1996–97 (listed with their first team, asterisk (*) marks debut in playoffs):
Dwayne Roloson, Calgary Flames
Roman Turek, Dallas Stars
Tomas Holmstrom, Detroit Red Wings
Mike Knuble, Detroit Red Wings
Mike Grier, Edmonton Oilers
Jean-Sebastien Giguere, Hartford Whalers
Tomas Vokoun, Montreal Canadiens
Bryan Berard, New York Islanders
Todd Bertuzzi, New York Islanders
Wade Redden, Ottawa Senators
Vaclav Prospal, Philadelphia Flyers
Dainius Zubrus, Philadelphia Flyers
Patrick Lalime, Pittsburgh Penguins

Last games

The following is a list of players of note who played their last game in the NHL in 1996–97 (listed with their last team):
Charlie Huddy, Buffalo Sabres
Denis Savard, Chicago Blackhawks
Sergei Makarov, Dallas Stars
Neal Broten, Dallas Stars
Mike Ramsey, Detroit Red Wings
Vladimir Konstantinov, Detroit Red Wings
Dale Hawerchuk, Philadelphia Flyers
Brad McCrimmon, Phoenix Coyotes
Joe Mullen, Pittsburgh Penguins
Tim Hunter, San Jose Sharks
Craig MacTavish, St. Louis Blues (the last helmetless player)
Jay Wells, Tampa Bay Lightning
Don Beaupre, Toronto Maple Leafs
Dave McLlwain, New York Islanders
Gary Leeman, St. Louis Blues

Trading deadline
 Trading Deadline: March 18, 1997
March 18, 1997: G Pat Jablonski traded from Montreal to Phoenix for D Steve Cheredaryk.
March 18, 1997: RW Roman Oksiuta traded from Anaheim to Pittsburgh for C Richard Park.
March 18, 1997: LW Josef Beranek traded from Vancouver to Pittsburgh for future considerations.
March 18, 1997: D Marc Hussey traded from Calgary to Chicago for LW Ravil Gusmanov.
March 18, 1997: C Ed Olczyk traded from Los Angeles to Pittsburgh for RW Glen Murray.
March 18, 1997: LW Jon Battaglia and Anaheim's fourth round pick in 1998 Entry Draft traded from Anaheim to Hartford for C Mark Janssens.
March 18, 1997: RW Mike Prokopec traded from Chicago to Ottawa for RW Denis Chasse, D Kevin Bolibruck, and Ottawa's sixth round pick in 1998 Entry Draft.
March 18, 1997: D Larry Murphy traded from Toronto to Detroit for future considerations.
March 18, 1997: LW Derek King traded from NY Islanders to Hartford for Hartford's fifth round pick in 1997 Entry Draft.
March 18, 1997: D Frantisek Kucera traded from Vancouver to Philadelphia for future considerations.
March 18, 1997: D Jamie Huscroft traded from Calgary to Tampa Bay for G Tyler Moss.
March 18, 1997: RW Kelly Chase traded from Hartford to Toronto for Toronto's eighth round pick in 1998 Entry Draft.
March 18, 1997: D Dave Manson traded from Phoenix to Montreal for RW Chris Murray and D Murray Baron.
March 18, 1997: RW Chris Murray traded from Phoenix to Hartford to D Gerald Diduck.
March 18, 1997: C Robert Reichel traded from Calgary to NY Islanders for LW Marty McInnis, G Tyrone Garner and Calgary's sixth round pick in 1997 Entry Draft (previously acquired by NY Islanders).
March 18, 1997: D Jeff Norton traded from Edmonton to Tampa Bay for D Drew Bannister and the earlier of Tampa Bay or Anaheim's sixth round draft pick in 1997 Entry Draft (Anaheim pick previously acquired by Tampa Bay).
March 18, 1997: LW Miroslav Satan traded from Edmonton to Buffalo for LW Barrie Moore and D Craig Millar.
March 18, 1997: C Kirk Muller traded from Toronto to Florida for RW Jason Podollan.

See also
 List of Stanley Cup champions
 1996 NHL Entry Draft
 47th National Hockey League All-Star Game
 National Hockey League All-Star Game
 NHL All-Rookie Team
 1996 World Cup of Hockey
 1996 in sports
 1997 in sports

References
 
 
 
 
Notes

External links
Hockey Database
NHL.com

 
1996–97 in Canadian ice hockey by league
1996–97 in American ice hockey by league